Silk & Soul is the thirteenth studio album by American musician Nina Simone released in October 1967 by RCA Victor. It features the cuts "Go to Hell" and a cover of "I Wish I Knew How It Would Feel to Be Free".

Information about songs on this album
In 1968, Simone got a Grammy nomination for Best Female R&B Vocal Performance for the song "Go to Hell" from this album. She lost to Aretha Franklin.
"It Be's That Way Sometime" was written by Nina's brother Sam Waymon.
"The Look of Love" is a song by Burt Bacharach, originally written for the movie Casino Royale (1967).
"I Wish I Knew How It Would Feel to Be Free" song was written by Billy Taylor. It was later recorded by Solomon Burke and Levon Helm, and can be regarded as a civil rights anthem.
"Turning Point", which at first seems to be a child's song about making a new friend, later turns into a song questioning the origins of racism. Lyrics written by Martha Holmes.
"Consummation" is a love song written by Nina Simone that uses the melody of "For All We Know", a song she originally recorded in the late 50s.

Track listing

Charts

Personnel
Nina Simone – piano, vocals
Gene Taylor – bass
Eric Gale, Rudy Stevenson - guitar
Ernie Hayes - piano, harpsichord
Bernard Purdie - drums
Sammy Lowe – arrangements, conductor
Technical
Ray Hall – engineer

References

1967 albums
Nina Simone albums
Albums conducted by Sammy Lowe
Albums produced by Danny Davis (country musician)
RCA Victor albums